Roland Cziurlock, (born November 30, 1967 in Opole, Silesia, Poland) is a retired German professional bodybuilder. Despite being born in the Silesian city, since 1986 in Poland, he competed for Germany. His best performances were in the 1990s and included a twelfth-place finish in Joe Weider's Mr. Olympia competition.

Contest history
1991 World Amateur Championships - IFBB, Light-HeavyWeight, 7th
1992 World Amateur Championships - IFBB, Light-HeavyWeight, 2nd
1993 World Amateur Championships - IFBB, Light-HeavyWeight, 1st
1994 Mr. Olympia - IFBB, 18th
1995 Night of Champions - IFBB, 5th
1996 Arnold Classic - IFBB, 7th
1996 Mr. Olympia - IFBB, 12th
1998 Arnold Classic - IFBB, 10th
2000 Night of Champions - IFBB, 16th
2001 Night of Champions - IFBB, did not place
2011 Miami Masters World - IFBB, 8th

External links
 Bodybuilder Search entry
 Roland Cziurlock 
 Forum - Roland Cziurlok 
 Cziurlok Roland

References 

Sportspeople from Opole
Polish emigrants to Germany
Polish bodybuilders
German bodybuilders
Professional bodybuilders
1967 births
Living people